is a Japanese badminton player who affiliated with Saishunkan team.

Career 
Kana Ito won the 2010 Polish Open, 2012 Croatioan International, 2012 Banuinvest International, and 2015 Vietnam International tournaments in women's singles event. She participated in the 2016 U.S. Open Grand Prix Gold, and many more. She was there the runner up and lost to Zhang Beiwen of United States in the final.

Achievements

BWF Grand Prix 
The BWF Grand Prix had two levels, the BWF Grand Prix and Grand Prix Gold. It was a series of badminton tournaments sanctioned by the Badminton World Federation (BWF) which was held from 2007 to 2017.

Women's singles

  BWF Grand Prix Gold tournament
  BWF Grand Prix tournament

BWF International Challenge/Series 
Women's singles

Women's doubles

  BWF International Challenge tournament
  BWF International Series tournament

References

External links 

 

1985 births
Living people
Sportspeople from Ishikawa Prefecture
Japanese female badminton players